Liceul Teoretic "Decebal" Constanța (English: "Decebal" High School of Constanța) is a high school in Constanța, Romania.

History

"Decebal" High School was established in 1970, as High School No.5 of Constanța, because of the large number of schoolchildren in the area and the lack of a STEM-profiled high school in this part of town.

In 1990, taking account the preferences of secondary school graduates but also the collective capacity of teachers, the school changed back to its former profile, under the name "Decebal" High School Constanța.

After taking over "Dimitrie Știubei" School and "Flipper" Kindergarten in 2010, "Decebal" High School educates over 1000 students, aged 3–19.

Alumni
 Gheorghe Hagi

References

Educational institutions established in 1970
Schools in Constanța
High schools in Romania
1970 establishments in Romania